Barbara Luisi is a photographer and a musician. After many years in New York City, she now lives and works in Vienna, Austria, and Venice, Italy. Her artist statement: "my work is concerned exclusively with the perception of three elements: darkness, sound and loneliness. As a trained classical violinist, I have to first hear my images and it is always this noise or music that triggers my themes."

Life and career
Barbara Luisi was born and raised in Munich, Germany. At the age of nine, she began studying the violin. After graduating from the Munich Arts and Music High School she studied violin at the Hochschule für Musik und Theater in Munich and obtained the Concert Diploma. She was a violinist in the Munich Philharmonic, the Orchestra of Toulouse and the Bavarian State Opera as well as being the "primaria" (first violinist) in the "Pocci String Quartet.”

At age seventeen, she began exploring photography, experimenting with a Leica M6 and developing her work in her own darkroom. During the past decade she has devoted her time to her photography and numerous projects and books.

Throughout the body of her work she explores her fascination with myriad manifestations of light, especially nocturnal light in the streets of New York, Florence, Oslo, Tokyo, Vienna and Paris or deep in ancient caves or reflected in seascapes.

Barbara Luisi is married to conductor Fabio Luisi, together they have three children.

On 21 January 2020 she made her debut in Carnegie Hall as a violinist in a program with harpist Alexander Boldechev.

Books
Nude Nature. Böhlau, 2007.
Glühende Nacht: Artificial Lights. Böhlau, 2008.
Pearls, Tears of the Sea Böhlau, 2011.
Dreamland Contrasto, 2014.

Exhibitions
Ausstellung Pearls, Tears of the Sea, Hamburg.
Nude Nature, Vienna
2014: Dreamland, Maison Européenne de la Photographie, Paris; Glorietta Gallery, Beirut, 2015 for PhotoMed.
2014: "Ouvres récentes," Maison de la Photographie, Paris.
2015: "Luci su Firenze, di notte",
2017: "The Spiritual South" Quick Art Center, NY
2018: "AKT" LeicaStore Rome, Italy and Rooney Gallery, Tokyo
2019 "Eternal Beauty" at SPARK, Venezia, Italy and "Secred Garden of India" Palazzo Grassi, Genova

References

General references

https://www.artapartofculture.net/2018/12/05/akt-fotografie-di-barbara-luisi-leica-store-roma/

External links
 "Opening night at the Quick Center honoring Visiting Master Barbara Luisi" on YouTube
 BARBARA LUISI A LA MEP
 Barbara Luisi at Artnet
 Luci su Firenze, di notte
 Rome AKT at LeicaStore
 Carnegie Hall Debut
 Eternal Beauty - Venice, Italy

Living people
German classical violinists
21st-century classical violinists
21st-century German photographers
Women violinists
German women photographers
21st-century German women artists
21st-century women musicians
Musicians from Munich
Year of birth missing (living people)
Photographers from Munich
21st-century women photographers